Kaur Kivistik (born 29 April 1991) is an Estonian athlete competing in the 3000 metres steeplechase. He won the silver medal at the 2015 Summer Universiade.

His personal best in the event is 8:28.55 set in Zagreb in 2019.

Achievements

Personal bests
Outdoor
400 metres – 52.97 (Võru 2013)
800 metres – 1:51.69 (Ogre 2018)
1000 metres – 2:25.34 (Kohila 2010)
1500 metres – 3:43.83 (Tartu 2014)
Mile – 4:08.6 (Tallinn 2015)
3000 metres – 8:09.99 (Rakvere 2014)
5000 metres – 14:00.97 (Azusa 2018)
3000 metres steeplechase – 8:28.55 (Zagreb 2019) NR
Half marathon – 1:05:36 (Ostia 2012)

Indoor
800 metres – 2:01.62 (Tartu 2012)
1500 metres – 3:49.05 (Tartu 2014)
2000 metres – 5:34.78 (Tartu 2010)
3000 metres – 8:18.72 (Tallinn 2015)

References

External links
 

1991 births
Living people
Estonian male steeplechase runners
World Athletics Championships athletes for Estonia
Athletes (track and field) at the 2016 Summer Olympics
Olympic athletes of Estonia
Universiade medalists in athletics (track and field)
Sportspeople from Tartu
Universiade silver medalists for Estonia
Competitors at the 2017 Summer Universiade
Medalists at the 2015 Summer Universiade